Pseudonocardia nantongensis is a bacterium from the genus of Pseudonocardia which ash been isolated from the  leaves of the plant Tamarix chinensis from Nantong in China.

References

Pseudonocardia
Bacteria described in 2014